Del Valle may refer to:


Places
 Del Valle, Mexico City, Mexico

United States
 Del Valle, California
 Del Valle, Texas
 Del Valle Independent School District
 Del Valle Regional Park, California
 Lake Del Valle, a storage reservoir

People
 Dennis Del Valle (born 1989), Puerto Rican volleyball player
 Pedro del Valle (1893–1978), USMC General

See also
 Del Valle High School (disambiguation)
 
 El Valle (disambiguation)
 Della Valle (disambiguation)
 Del (disambiguation)
 Del Val, a surname